Robert (Bob) Samuel John Irvine is a New Zealand former rugby league footballer who represented New Zealand.

Playing career
Irvine played at halfback for Canterbury and the South Island. He played for the South Island in their 1963 match against South Africa.

In 1965, Irvine made his debut for New Zealand, becoming Kiwi #442. Irvine went on to play in seven test matches for New Zealand.

Irvine won the New Zealand Rugby League's player of the year award in 1968.

References

Living people
New Zealand rugby league players
New Zealand national rugby league team players
Canterbury rugby league team players
Rugby league halfbacks
South Island rugby league team players
Year of birth missing (living people)